The Syretsko–Pecherska line is the third line of the Kyiv Metro, first opened in 1989. It extends the metro system southeast along the right bank of the Dnieper River before crossing it on a covered bridge and then east from there. The northern section extends further northwestwards. The line is one of the newest and shows some post-independence decorative motifs. Technically, it is also a great development, with most of the platforms longer and wider than older sections and with some stations having provision for disabled access. This line is coloured green in the maps.

Stations 
 Syrets
 Dorohozhychi
 Lukianivska
 Lvivska Brama 
 Zoloti Vorota → Teatralna 
 Palats Sportu → Ploshcha Lva Tolstoho 
 Klovska
 Pecherska
 Druzhby Narodiv
 Vydubychi
 Telychka 
 Slavutych
 Osokorky
 Pozniaky
 Kharkivska
 Vyrlytsia
 Boryspilska
 Chervony Khutir

Timeline

In addition, there is an unfinished station named Lvivska Brama between Lukianivska and Zoloti Vorota and a derelict Telychka station, located between Vydubychi and Slavutych.

Name changes

Transfers

Rolling stock
Initially the line shared the Obolon (№ 2) depot with the Obolonsko–Teremkivska line. On August 23, 2007, construction of the dedicated Kharkivska (№ 3) depot (tracks connection extended from its Chervony Khutir terminus) was complete, to which the Syretsko–Pecherska line trains have been transferred. 27 five-carriage trains are assigned to this line. Most of them are of type 81-717.5/714.5, built in the late 1980's. But also some trains of type 81-540.2K/541.2K and the 81-7021/7022 (built from 2005 to 2009).

Recent developments and future plans

Extensions
On the far end of the Pechersky radius, a project that has been approved and finalised exists to bring the line from its current terminus Chervony Khutir to the Darnytsia station of the Sviatoshynsko–Brovarska line with six stations and one depot. This extension will connect the new Darnytsia Railway Station and also create a major redevelopment into the eastern districts of Kyiv. The stations include: Promyslova, Vulytsia Horbunova, Darnytsky Vokzal, Prazka, Leninhradska Ploscha and Darnytsia. At the present time, only the station Chervony Khutir and the urgently needed №3 depot Kharkivske are under construction. Both were originally planned to open in August 2007, but now the station has been delayed until 2010.

On the opposite end of the line, on the Syretsky radius, another extension with the stations Mostytska, Prospekt Pravdy, Vynohradar and Marshala Hrechka (earlier known as Synioozerna) were to open by 2020, along with a new depot. This extension will bring the line to the city's northwestern borders and will connect the distant neighbourhood of Vynohradar. In November 2018 Kyiv Metro signed a contract for the build of the Mostytska and Prospekt Pravdy subway stations and a branch line toward the Vynohradar station, the deadline for completion was set for 2021. In August 2020 Kyiv mayor Vitali Klitschko promises to complete construction of the two new metro stations by the end of 2021. On 1 February 2021 he stated that they will be opened by the summer of 2021. On 8 July 2021 Kyiv Metro stated that the construction of the new metro stations Mostytska and Prospekt Pravdy was on schedule would open by the end of 2021. It was added that the city and the subway required the contractor to meet construction deadlines and complete all planned works on time (as planned - by the end of 2021), unless the Chamber of Commerce agreed on the existence of force majeure that would slow down the works. Early September 2021 the Chamber of Commerce agreed there was such and the expiration of the contract with the Kyiv Metro was to be postpone from November 2021 to May 2023.

Ghost stations 

One of the most notable facts that the line is known for is that stations for which the construction had begun were deliberately passed over for later openings. This happened often with the lack of financing, but the need for continuing to extend the system. One of these stations were Pecherska which opened six years after the extension which carried it (Klovska-Vydubych). At present there are three stations that remain unfinished on the line, with various prospects of opening.

Lvivska Brama is the first of such, a deep underground station that exists in a half-built state, with the underground part structurally complete and even partially decorated, and lacking an escalator tunnel and a lobby. For many years it appeared on the map as under-construction with no actual work taking place, the scheduled opening year being shifted perpetually.

Telychka is another unopened station, on the right bank of the Dnieper River, that is sealed off completely, with no illumination at most times, and has remained such since the tunnels were built back in 1990. It was not opened because there was no need for it, since the Lower Telychka industrial area (which the station was planned to serve) quickly deteriorated with the end of the Soviet Union. However, there is a proposed re-development plan of the area and, as the station is sub-surface and structurally complete, it will not be difficult to finish and open the station should a need arise.

Finally, between Lukianivska and Dorohozhychi, a provision exists for another deep station, the project name for which is Vulytsia Hertsena (Hertzen street). Currently, there are no plans to complete the station at all, due to the difficulty in building a deep-level station on an existing stretch being very costly, as well as impractical, particularly in the light of more important projects such as Podilsko–Voskresenska and Livoberezhna lines, which will not be completed until 2025 at the least.

All three stations satisfy a regulatory requirement of having stations (including ghost ones, capable of serving as emergency exits or fire shelters) no farther than 2000 m (1¼ mi) apart.

Also, these stations host traction substations, ventilation and drainage equipment as all ordinary stations do. Currently, only Lvivska Brama is staffed 24/7 with a station agent, the others being visited by maintenance personnel only occasionally.

Other projects 
Other projects include a general upgrade of stations, in particular the construction of a second entrance to the Druzhby Narodiv station and a complex repair of Lukianivska which suffers from hydroisolation problems.

References

External links 

  Syretsko–Pecherska line, Kyiv Metro official site

Kyiv Metro lines
Railway lines opened in 1989
1989 establishments in Ukraine